Giichi (written 儀一 or 義一), is a masculine Japanese given name. Notable people with the name include:

, Japanese baseball player
, Japanese film director, screenwriter, producer and actor
, Japanese human rights activist
, Imperial Japanese Army general, politician and Prime Minister of Japan
, Japanese yōga painter

Japanese masculine given names